The Java Development Kit (JDK) is a distribution of Java Technology by Oracle Corporation. It implements the Java Language Specification (JLS) and the Java Virtual Machine Specification (JVMS) and provides the Standard Edition (SE) of the Java Application Programming Interface (API). It is derivative of the community driven OpenJDK which Oracle stewards. It provides software for working with Java applications. Examples of included software are the virtual machine, a compiler, performance monitoring tools, a debugger, and other utilities that Oracle considers useful for a Java programmer.

Oracle have released the current version of the software under the Oracle No-Fee Terms and Conditions (NFTC) license. Oracle release binaries for the x86-64 architecture for Windows, macOS, and Linux based operating systems, and for the aarch64 architecture for macOS and Linux. Previous versions have supported the Oracle Solaris operating system and SPARC architecture.

Oracle's primary implementation of the JVMS is known as the HotSpot (virtual machine).

JDK contents 
The JDK has as its primary components a collection of programming tools, including:

 appletviewer – this tool can be used to run and debug Java applets without a web browser
 apt – the annotation-processing tool
 extcheck – a utility that detects JAR file conflicts
 idlj – the IDL-to-Java compiler. This utility generates Java bindings from a given Java IDL file.
 jabswitch – the Java Access Bridge. Exposes assistive technologies on Microsoft Windows systems.
 java – the loader for Java applications. This tool is an interpreter and can interpret the class files generated by the javac compiler. Now a single launcher is used for both development and deployment. The old deployment launcher, jre,  comes with Sun JDK, and instead it has been replaced by this new java loader.
 javac – the Java compiler, which converts source code into Java bytecode
 javadoc – the documentation generator, which automatically generates documentation from source code comments
 jar – the archiver, which packages related class libraries into a single JAR file. This tool also helps manage JAR files.
 javafxpackager – tool to package and sign JavaFX applications
 jarsigner – the jar signing and verification tool
 javah – the C header and stub generator, used to write native methods
 javap – the class file disassembler
 javaws – the Java Web Start launcher for JNLP applications
 JConsole – Java Monitoring and Management Console
 jdb – the debugger
 jhat – Java Heap Analysis Tool (experimental)
 jinfo – This utility gets configuration information from a running Java process or crash dump. (experimental)
 jmap Oracle jmap - Memory Map– This utility outputs the memory map for Java and can print shared object memory maps or heap memory details of a given process or core dump. (experimental)
 jmc – Java Mission Control 
 jpackage – a tool for generating self-contained application bundles. (experimental)
 jps – Java Virtual Machine Process Status Tool lists the instrumented HotSpot Java Virtual Machines (JVMs) on the target system. (experimental)
 jrunscript – Java command-line script shell.
 jshell - a read–eval–print loop, introduced in Java 9.
 jstack – utility that prints Java stack traces of Java threads (experimental)
 jstat – Java Virtual Machine statistics monitoring tool (experimental)
 jstatd – jstat daemon (experimental)
 keytool – tool for manipulating the keystore
 pack200 – JAR compression tool
 policytool – the policy creation and management tool, which can determine policy for a Java runtime, specifying which permissions are available for code from various sources.
 VisualVM – visual tool integrating several command-line JDK tools and lightweight performance and memory profiling capabilities (no longer included in JDK 9+)
 wsimport – generates portable JAX-WS artifacts for invoking a web service.
 xjc – Part of the Java API for XML Binding (JAXB) API. It accepts an XML schema and generates Java classes.

Experimental tools may not be available in future versions of the JDK.

The JDK also comes with a complete Java Runtime Environment (JRE), usually called a private runtime, due to the fact that it is separated from the "regular" JRE and has extra contents. It consists of a Java Virtual Machine and all of the class libraries present in the production environment, as well as additional libraries only useful to developers, such as the internationalization libraries and the IDL libraries.

Copies of the JDK also include a wide selection of example programs demonstrating the use of almost all portions of the Java API.

Other JDKs
In addition to the most widely used JDK discussed in this article, there are other JDKs commonly available for a variety of platforms, some of which started from the Sun JDK source and some that did not.  All adhere to the basic Java specifications, but often differ in explicitly unspecified areas, such as garbage collection, compilation strategies, and optimization techniques.  They include:

In development or in maintenance mode:
 Azul Systems Zing, low latency JDK for Linux;
 Azul Systems / OpenJDK-based Zulu for Linux, Windows, Mac OS X, embedded and the cloud;
 OpenJDK / IcedTea;
 Aicas JamaicaVM;
 IBM J9 JDK, for AIX, Linux, Windows, MVS, OS/400, Pocket PC, z/OS;

Not being maintained or discontinued:
 Apache Harmony;
 Apple's Mac OS Runtime for Java JVM/JDK for Classic Mac OS;
 Blackdown Java – Port of Sun's JDK for Linux;
GNU's Classpath and GCJ (The GNU Compiler for Java);
 Oracle Corporation's JRockit JDK, for Windows, Linux, and Solaris;

See also

 Classpath
 Java platform
 Java version history

References

External links
 Oracle Java SE
 Oracle Java SE Support Roadmap
 Open source OpenJDK project
 OpenJDK builds from Oracle
 OpenJDK builds from AdoptOpenJDK
 IBM Java SDK Downloads
 Open source JDK 7 project
 GNU Classpath – a Free software JDK alternative

JDK
Software development kits
Oracle software
Sun Microsystems software